Tomaszów Mazowiecki (or Tomashuv) is a city in central Poland with 60,529 inhabitants (2021). The fourth most populous city in the Łódź Voivodeship and the second with free public transport. It the seat of Tomaszów County. In Tomaszów Mazowiecki there is the first (and the only) all-year speed skating track in Poland - Ice Arena Tomaszów Mazowiecki, which has been hosting the World Championships. In autumn, the city hosts the international Love Polish Jazz festival, organized by the Polish Ministry of Culture and National Heritage.

Location 

Tomaszów is situated in the Łódź Voivodeship (since 1999); previously, it was part of Piotrków Voivodeship (1975–1998). The town is situated on the banks of three rivers, the Pilica, Wolbórka, and Czarna Bielina, and is near the Sulejow Reservoir and the edge of the Puszcza Spalska wilderness area.

History 

Tomaszów Mazowiecki was formed in 1788 in the Crown of the Kingdom of Poland by owner these lands – Tomasz Ostrowski based on local supply of the iron ore. Ostrowski invited the first miners and metallurgists from the Old-Polish Industrial Region. The settlement fell into the Prussian Partition in 1793 during the Second Partition of Poland. In 1807 it was regained by Poles and included within the short-lived Duchy of Warsaw, and since 1815 it was located in the Russian Partition. The metal industry was expanded around 1820. Tomaszów received city rights in 1830 during the Polish November Uprising against the Russian Empire. The first weavers came to Tomaszów from Zgorzelec. The first Lutheran church was established in 1823. In 1825, Antoni Ostrowski transferred from the village of Tobiasze to Tomaszów a Catholic parish with the church of St. Wenceslas – Duke of Bohemia, which was located at Wieczność St., in the area of the first Catholic cemetery (nowadays Słowackiego St). In 1831 Qahal was founded. During the January Uprising, on July 12 and September 1, 1863, clashes between Polish insurgents and Russian soldiers took place. From 1867, it was administratively located in the Piotrków Governorate.

During World War I, Tomaszów was occupied by Germany, which policies led to poverty and hunger among the population. During the war, local Poles organized secret resistance in the town, including the Polish Military Organisation. After the war, on November 11, 1918, Poland regained independence, and the Poles disarmed German troops, who afterwards left the town. In mid-November 1918, the town's first Polish military unit was organized. Within interwar Poland, the Polish Army was stationed in the town, and it administratively belonged to the Łódź Voivodeship. By 1931 the Jewish population of the city grew to 11,310 inhabitants, or about 30% of the general population of Tomaszów.

World War II 

On September 1, 1939, the first day of the German-Soviet invasion of Poland that started World War II, the Germans air raided the town twice, killing seven people. Further air raids were carried out in the following days, forcing many inhabitants to flee. The Germans bombed houses, factories and fire engines. On September 6, the Battle of Tomaszów Mazowiecki was fought between Poland and Germany. On September 7, the Germans entered the town and the Einsatzgruppe III arrived to commit various atrocities against the populace. The Germans then looted the town, burned houses, and committed some murders of its inhabitants. On September 26, the Germans founded a local branch of the Arbeitsamt, which sent local Poles to forced labour. The Great Synagogue was burned to the ground as first on 16 October 1939; the remaining two synagogues were destroyed on 714 November.

Before the Polish Independence Day (November 11), in 1939, the German police carried out mass arrests of about 300 Poles, including priests, teachers, doctors, judges, workers and activists. Most were released after November 11, but some, including the pre-war mayor, were imprisoned in Piotrków Trybunalski. Further mass arrests of Poles were carried out in January, June and August 1940. On 12–13 June, the Germans arrested 280 people, while on 12–13 August they arrested many women. The victims were then interrogated by the Gestapo, and most were afterwards deported to the Sachsenhausen, Ravensbrück and Buchenwald concentration camps, while some were murdered on the spot. A ghetto for the imprisonment of 16,500 Polish Jews was created in December 1940 and closed off from the outside in December 1941. Hunger was rampant, followed by the typhus epidemic. In December 1942, 15,000 Jews were deported aboard Holocaust trains to the Treblinka extermination camp. Some 200 Jews from Tomaszów are known to have survived World War II. The Germans carried out further executions of Poles, among which was priest Wojciech Dionizy Bryndza-Nacki, and also established and operated a Nazi prison, and a Baudienst forced labour camp for young Poles in the town. In 1944, even 12-year-old Polish children were used as slave labourers to build fortifications in the area in preparation for the advancing Eastern Front. In 1944, during and following the Warsaw Uprising, the Germans deported thousands of Varsovians from the Dulag 121 camp in Pruszków, where they were initially imprisoned, to Tomaszów Mazowiecki. Those Poles were mainly old people, ill people and women with children. 30,000 Poles expelled from Warsaw stayed in the town and nearby settlements, as of 1 November 1944.

Geography 

In the valley of the Pilica river in the south-eastern part of the town, there is a unique natural karst spring of water containing calcium salts, that is an object of protection in Niebieskie Źródła Nature Reserve in Sulejów Landscape Park. The origin of the name of the reserve Niebieskie Źródła, which means Blue Springs, comes from the fact that red waves are absorbed by water and only blue and green are reflected from the bottom of the spring, giving that atypical colour. The reserve is situated near the end of Saint Anthony Street (in Polish: ulica świętego Antoniego) that begins in the centre of Tomaszów Mazowiecki, in proximity to the central Kościuszko Square.

Climate
Tomaszów Mazowiecki has a humid continental climate (Cfb in the Köppen climate classification).

Economy 

Since the mid-19th century to the 1990s, a large center of the textile industry. The second, after Łódź, center of clothing wool production in the Congress Poland and nineteenth-century Russia. In the 20th century – thanks to Tomaszów's Artificial Silk Factory – one of the largest European centers for the production of fibers and plastics. Nowadays, Tomaszów Mazowiecki incorporates the Łódź Special Economic Zone, which is one of the 14 special economic zones in Poland. The city is home to a variety of industries: ceramics, construction, chemicals, plastics producers, electrical machinery manufacturers, upholstery, food, logistics and service.

Materials Industry 

The major minerals companies in the area are Ceramika Paradyż a manufacturer of ceramic tiles and Sacmi which specialises in ceramic tile production machines. The Wagran factory (built on the area of the former Artificial Silk Company of Tomaszów), is a producer of granite sinks

Construction Sector  
Within the construction sector Balex Metal produces high quality steel construction components. Ezbud-Budownictwo focuses on the construction of residential and service premises, sales and management of constructed properties and also produces ready-mixed concrete and other building materials. The company has been engaged in the construction of several housing estates in Tomaszów and Łódź from 1989 onwards and since 2019 has been the main sponsor of  Tomaszów's largest football club  - "Lechia 1923".

Chemical Industry  

Major chemical companies in Tomaszów include Sicher Bautechnik which is a producer of construction chemicals, EcoHydroCarbon which specializes in polymer waste processing and Toma a plastics processing company that also operates a private clinic at its plant for employees to use.

Equipment Manufacturers  
The region has several specialist equipment manufacturers that include Markom, a producer of welding and transport equipment, and Glass Product, which manufactures automatic fertilization and raw material transport systems.

Carpets and upholstery industry 

The Japanese car manufacturer Toyota has a base in Tomaszów, specializing in the production of upholstery for its range of premium vehicles. Weltom, a producer or carpets and rugs, also has a base in the city. The company was founded by Eleonora and Jan Roland. Their son, Edward Roland, began the business in 1848 from a small workshop consisting of a spinning mill and a weaving mill operated by three people. The workshop was located on Kaliska Street (today Piłsudskiego). In 1905, the company had expanded to employ a hundred and thirty weavers. The company quickly made a name for itself and became known throughout the Russian Empire. After World War II, the company was nationalized and renamed the "Weltom". In the 1990s, the plant underwent a transformation into a joint-stock company. Today, in addition to carpets, the company produces upholstery and coconut wipers. The entire western district of the city (Rolandówka) has been named after the company's founders.

Food Industry 

Within Tomaszów's food and beverage sector PepsiCo produces the famous Cheetos crisps, Chipita produces croissants and Roldrob (Drosed) produces poultry products for customers such as KFC. Additionally, Las Vegas is a producer of energy drinks where the group also own the "Bulwary" shopping center in the city.

Logistics and Services Sector 
Other companies in the region specializing in logistics and services are FM Logistic, serving Carrefour and Makro Cash and Carry, and Syntom, a recycling company.

Sport

The sports venue Ice Arena Tomaszów Mazowiecki hosts main international speed skating competitions; including ISU Speed Skating World Cups. It is also an ice hockey venue.

Education

There are seven high schools in Tomaszów Mazowiecki as well as branches of notable universities including:
 Branch of University of Łódź 
 Branch of Pułaski University of Technology and Humanities in Radom (pl)
 Branch of Wyższa Szkoła Biznesu i Przedsiębiorczości in Ostrowiec (pl)

Points of interest
In the city there is  first in Poland year-round ice skating rink that serves for speed skating, figure skating, ice hockey, short track and roller skating. It is located near Pilica River.

During the occupation of Poland in World War II, several strategic bunkers were built by Nazi Germany near Tomaszów Mazowiecki. The construction of the two large air-raid shelters was started in early 1940.
The shelters in Konewka and in Jeleń, built of reinforced concrete, served as unloading stations for military cargo.

Sulejowski Reservoir 

The Sulejow Lake is a large reservoir built from 1969–1973 in order to help meet the demand for fresh drinking water in the city of Łódź and the city of Tomaszów Mazowiecki. The reservoir is situated on the territory of three gminas: Tomaszów, Piotrków and Wolbórz. It is a popular place for water sports, including windsurfing, canoeing and sailing.

Grottoes in Nagórzyce (district of Tomaszów) 

In the south of the town there is an eighteenth-century quartz sand mine - The Nagórzyckie Grottoes (Polish: Groty Nagórzyckie). Today, an underground tourist route. At the entrance there is a pavilion with ticket desk, food vending machines and public toilets. They can be reached from the town center by a city bus or by an illuminated bicycle path.

Transport 

Since 1929 in the city exist bus public transport. Now, this is 773 routes during weekdays and 375 at the weekend. Since 2018, public transport in the city is free of charge.

Directly by train from Tomaszów it is possible to travel to: Kraków, Łodź, Poznań, Gdynia, Szczecin.

Several national and regional routes cross each other in the city:
 direction Suwałki – Warszawa – Tomaszów Mazowiecki – Wrocław – Kudowa-Zdrój
 direction Kozienice – Dęblin – Kock
 direction Łódź – Tomaszów Mazowiecki – Januszewice near Opoczno

International relations

Twin towns — Sister cities
Tomaszów Mazowiecki is twinned with:
 Mionica, Serbia
 Prato, Italy
 Ivano-Frankivsk, Ukraine
 Linares, Spain
 Polonezköy, Turkey

Polish Armed Forces

The 25th Air Cavalry Brigade is deployed in Tomaszów Mazowiecki. Headquarters there are in the town and main barracks. Garnison Polish Armed Forces in Tomaszów Mazowiecki has existed since 1918. At the north-eastern border of the town, by Expressway S8 there is the Brigade airport (Tomaszów Mazowiecki Airport).

Notable people
Karolina Bosiek (born 2000), Polish speed skater
Maria Ciach (1933–2008), Polish javelin thrower
Tadeusz Chmielewski (1927–2016), Polish film director, screenwriter and film producer
Moshe Dluznowsky (1903–1977), Polish-born Jewish-American journalist, publicist, writer
Mirosława Jastrzębska (1921–1982),  curator of the Regional Museum in Tomaszów Mazowiecki
Heidi Knake-Werner (born 1943), German politician (Die Linke)
Izabela Kuna (born 1970), Polish actress
Oskar Lange (1904–1965), Polish economist
Bogusław Mec (born 1947), Polish singer
Bolesław Mołojec (1909–1942), Polish communist activist, prominent commander in The International Brigades during War in Spain
Wanda Panfil-González (born 1959), Polish long-distance runner 
Jaromir Radke (born 1969), Polish speed skater
Michael Sela (1924–2022), Israeli immunologist; President of the Weizmann Institute of Science

Gallery

References

External links 

"NaszTomaszów.pl" - the most popular online newspaper
Radio Fama Tomaszów Mazowiecki
Tomaszów Mazowiecki TV (online)
 

Cities and towns in Łódź Voivodeship
Tomaszów Mazowiecki County
Piotrków Governorate
Łódź Voivodeship (1919–1939)
Holocaust locations in Poland
Nazi war crimes in Poland